New Mexico State Road 528 (NM 528) is a  state highway in Sandoval County and Bernalillo County, New Mexico. NM 528 is signed as Alameda Blvd.  In Rio Rancho, the road is also known as Pat D'Arco Highway, named after former mayor of Rio Rancho Pat D'Arco. It is an L-shaped route signed north-south in Sandoval County and east-west in Bernalillo County.

Route description
NM 528 begins on the east side of a diamond interchange with Interstate 25 (I-25) at Frontage road 2523 (FR 2523) in northern Albuquerque in Bernalillo County. It then heads west along Alameda Boulevard where it intersects 2nd Street NW, which carries NM 47. The route crosses the Rio Grande and then turns to the northwest. At Coors Boulevard, it intersects NM 448. The highway then turns north and enters Rio Rancho in Sandoval County.

Through Rio Rancho, NM 528, known as Pat D'Arco Highway, is a major north–south street. It serves major retailers, restaurants, and other businesses. Feeder streets which connect adjacent neighborhoods cross Pat D'Arco Highway at regular intervals. It meets NM 448 again near its own northern end. The route ends at U.S. Route 550 (US 550) on the northern edge of Rio Rancho.

Major intersections

See also

References

External links

528
Transportation in Bernalillo County, New Mexico
Transportation in Sandoval County, New Mexico
Transportation in Albuquerque, New Mexico